Events from the year 1976 in Canada.

Incumbents

Crown 
 Monarch – Elizabeth II

Federal government 
 Governor General – Jules Léger
 Prime Minister – Pierre Trudeau
 Chief Justice – Bora Laskin (Ontario)
 Parliament – 30th

Provincial governments

Lieutenant governors 
Lieutenant Governor of Alberta – Ralph Steinhauer  
Lieutenant Governor of British Columbia – Walter Stewart Owen 
Lieutenant Governor of Manitoba – William John McKeag (until March 15) then Francis Lawrence Jobin 
Lieutenant Governor of New Brunswick – Hédard Robichaud
Lieutenant Governor of Newfoundland – Gordon Arnaud Winter 
Lieutenant Governor of Nova Scotia – Clarence Gosse  
Lieutenant Governor of Ontario – Pauline Mills McGibbon
Lieutenant Governor of Prince Edward Island – Gordon Lockhart Bennett 
Lieutenant Governor of Quebec – Hugues Lapointe 
Lieutenant Governor of Saskatchewan – Stephen Worobetz (until February 29) then George Porteous

Premiers 
Premier of Alberta – Peter Lougheed  
Premier of British Columbia – Bill Bennett 
Premier of Manitoba – Edward Schreyer  
Premier of New Brunswick – Richard Hatfield
Premier of Newfoundland – Frank Moores
Premier of Nova Scotia – Gerald Regan  
Premier of Ontario – Bill Davis 
Premier of Prince Edward Island – Alexander B. Campbell 
Premier of Quebec – Robert Bourassa (until November 25) then René Lévesque
Premier of Saskatchewan – Allan Blakeney

Territorial governments

Commissioners 
 Commissioner of Yukon – James Smith (until July 1) then Arthur MacDonald Pearson 
 Commissioner of Northwest Territories – Stuart Milton Hodgson

Events

January 14 – The Eaton's catalogue is discontinued.
January 28 – The government of Saskatchewan takes over the province's potash industry.
February 4 – The Supreme Court rules provinces cannot censor movies.
February 7 – Joe Clark is elected leader of the Progressive Conservative Party of Canada, replacing Robert Stanfield.
March 23 – The Norman Bethune Memorial unveiled in Montreal
April 1 – The Canadian Radio-television and Telecommunications Commission is given the power to regulate Canadian television and radio.
April 15 – Dome Petroleum is given approval to drill for oil in the Beaufort Sea.
May 2 – Time's Canadian edition is discontinued.
June 25 – The CN Tower opens to the public in Toronto.
June 30 – St. Anne's Residential School closes.
June 30 – Parliament votes to abolish the death penalty.
July 17 – Opening Ceremony of the Montreal Summer Olympic.
October 14 – Over a million workers stage a one-day strike to protest wage and price controls.
November 15 – In the Quebec election, René Lévesque's Parti Québécois wins a majority, defeating Robert Bourassa's Parti libéral du Québec.
November 25 – René Lévesque becomes premier of Quebec, replacing Robert Bourassa.

Full date unknown
The Timbit is introduced (April 1976)
L'Express de Toronto is created
Tannereye Ltd company is established

Arts and literature

New works
Marian Engel: Bear
Hugh Hood: Dark Glasses
Joy Fielding: The Transformation
Farley Mowat: Canada North Now: The Great Betrayal

Awards
See 1976 Governor General's Awards for a complete list of winners and finalists for those awards.
Stephen Leacock Award: Harry J. Boyle, The Luck of the Irish
Vicky Metcalf Award: Suzanne Martel

Film
The Man Who Skied Down Everest becomes the first Canadian dramatic film to win an Academy Award

Television
Second City Television premiers

Sport
February 7 - Toronto Maple Leafs star Darryl Sittler scores ten points in one game.
March 14 - Toronto Varsity Blues won their University Cup by defeating the Guelph Gryphons 7–2 at Varsity Arena in Toronto
May 16 - Montreal Canadiens won their nineteenth Stanley Cup by defeating the Philadelphia Flyers 4 games to 0. Riverton, Manitoba's Reggie Leach became the first player to be awarded the Conn Smythe Trophy in a losing effort.
May 16 - Hamilton Fincupswon their only Memorial Cup by defeating the New Westminster Bruins 5–2. All games were played at the Montreal Forum
July 17 - Canada hosted its First Olympics when the 1976 Summer Olympics opened at Olympic Stadium in Montreal
May 27 - Winnipeg Jets won their First Avco Cup by defeating the Houston Aeros 4 games to 0. The deciding Game 4 was played at Winnipeg Arena
August 28 - Toronto Metros-Croatia won their only Soccer Bowl defeating the Minnesota Kicks 3–0 at Soccer Bowl '76 played at the Kingdome, in Seattle, Washington
November 19 - Western Ontario Mustangs won their Third Vanier Cup by defeating the Acadia Axemen 29–13 in the 12th Vanier Cup played at Varsity Stadium in Toronto
November 28 - Ottawa Rough Riders won their Ninth (and Final) Grey Cup by defeating the Saskatchewan Roughriders by the score 23 to 20 in the 64th Grey Cup played at Exhibition Stadium in Toronto.

Full date unknown
Walter Wolf Racing becomes first Canadian Formula One constructor.

Births

January to March
January 7 - Éric Gagné, baseball player
January 23 - Phillip Boudreault, boxer
February 19 - Brian Price, coxswain, Olympic gold medallist and World Champion
February 23 - Jeff O'Neill, ice hockey player
March 9 - Ben Mulroney, television host
March 23 - Nolan Baumgartner, ice hockey player

April to June
April 3 - Daniel Lewis, volleyball player
April 16 - Maxime Giroux, film director
May 10 - Kristen French, murder victim (d.1992)
May 12 - Kardinal Offishall, rap musician and producer
May 13 - Bobbi Jo Steadward, field hockey player
May 19 - Jason Botterill, ice hockey player and manager
June 10 - James Moore, politician and Minister
June 13 - Mark Versfeld, swimmer
June 25 - Michelle Bowyer, field hockey player
June 26 - Ed Jovanovski, ice hockey player

July to September
July 3 - Wade Belak, ice hockey player
July 5 - Leslie Mahaffy, murder victim (d.1991)
July 12 - Dan Boyle, ice hockey player
July 13 - Sheldon Souray, ice hockey player
August 5 - Jeff Friesen, ice hockey player
August 17 - Eric Boulton, ice hockey player
August 27 - Sarah Chalke, actress
August 29 - Kasia Kulesza, Polish-born synchronised swimmer
September 5 - Pat Thornton, comedian
September 13 - José Théodore, ice hockey player
September 17 - Zac Bierk, ice hockey player
September 26 - Jean-François Marceau, judoka

October to December
October 1 - Denis Gauthier, ice hockey player
October 10 - Shane Doan, ice hockey player
October 23 - Ryan Reynolds, actor
November 6 - Catherine Clark, television broadcaster
November 20 - Laura Harris, actress
November 26 - Mathieu Darche, ice hockey player
December 26 - Nadia Litz, actress
December 26 - Jake Wetzel, rower, Olympic gold medallist and World Champion

Deaths

January to June
February 9 - Percy Faith, band-leader, orchestrator and composer (b.1908)
March 3 - Alexander Wallace Matheson, politician and Premier of Prince Edward Island (b.1903)
April 5 - Wilder Penfield, neurosurgeon (b.1891)
April 11 - Art Alexandre, ice hockey player (b.1909)
May 28 - William Ross Macdonald, politician, Speaker of the House of Commons of Canada and 21st Lieutenant Governor of Ontario (b.1891)
June 10 - William John Patterson, politician and 6th Premier of Saskatchewan (b.1886)

July to December
August 4 - Roy Thomson, 1st Baron Thomson of Fleet, newspaper proprietor and media entrepreneur (b.1894)
August 8 - Wilson Duff, anthropologist (b.1925)
August 28 - Lloyd Stinson, politician (b.1904)
September 28 - Raymond Collishaw, World War I flying ace (b.1893)
November 14 - Jean-Paul Beaulieu, politician and chartered accountant (b.1902)
November 29 - Steve Peters, politician (b.1912)
December 4 - Paul Gouin, politician (b.1898)
December 16 - Réal Caouette, politician (b.1917)
December 22 - Olive Diefenbaker, wife of John Diefenbaker, 13th Prime Minister of Canada (b.1902)

See also
 1976 in Canadian television
 List of Canadian films of 1976

References

 
Years of the 20th century in Canada
Canada
1976 in North America